Thomas & Friends (originally known as Thomas the Tank Engine & Friends and later Thomas & Friends: Big World! Big Adventures!) is a British children's television series that aired across 24 series from 1984 to 2021. Based on The Railway Series books by Rev. W. Awdry and his son Christopher, the series was developed for television by Britt Allcroft. The series follows the adventures of Thomas, an anthropomorphised blue steam locomotive on the fictional North Western Railway on the Island of Sodor, and several other anthropomorphised locomotives on the North Western Railway, including Edward, Henry, Gordon, James, Percy, and Toby. They work for the Fat Controller.

In the United States, it was first broadcast along with the spin-off series Shining Time Station on PBS' PTV Park block in 1989.

The rights to the series are currently owned by HIT Entertainment (a subsidiary of Mattel), which acquired Gullane Entertainment in July 2002.

A new 2D-animated series, Thomas & Friends: All Engines Go, premiered on 13 September 2021 on Cartoon Network.

History

Predecessors
The first attempt to adapt Awdry's stories for television came in 1953, when the editor of the Railway Series books, Eric Marriott, was approached by the BBC, who wished to use live-action model trains to re-create two stories from Awdry's first book, The Three Railway Engines. 00 gauge Hornby Dublo models appeared on sets that reflected the style of the original illustrations. The first episode (based on "The Sad Story of Henry") was broadcast live on the evening of Sunday 14 June 1953 from Lime Grove Studios. The live broadcast did not fare well: a failure to switch the points caused the model of Henry to derail and it had to be replaced on the rails by one of the operators. The models moved jerkily, and all effects and music had to be superimposed.

News of the broadcast hit the front pages of The Daily Telegraph and the Daily Mail. Awdry branded the episode "unprofessional", and the point-switching debacle an "elementary mistake". As a result, the second episode scheduled for 28 June 1953 was put on hold, and then later cancelled. The BBC offered Awdry and the Railway Series publishers greater creative control over the production, but the publishers declined, preferring to focus on publishing new books for the series.

Nearly twenty years later, the BBC featured Awdry's stories in the television story-telling show Jackanory. Fourteen years before Thomas and Friends was aired, Ted Ray (sitting in a stationmaster's office) read five Railway Series books in episodes that aired between 20 September to 2 October 1970.

In 1973, Andrew Lloyd Webber (who had read The Railway Series as a child) approached publisher Kaye & Ward with a proposal for a musical television series, with songs from himself and lyricist Peter Reeves. However, the publishers and the author refused to give Lloyd Webber's company "control of almost everything", which Lloyd Webber's lawyers argued was necessary in order to "secure the investment money from America which would be needed to pay for the animation and the film-making." The status of the project seemed uncertain, and while Stanley Pickard (Kaye & Ward's managing director at the time) told Awdry that he was "maintaining personal contact with Andrew and still had a slight hope that there might be a way out", Awdry remained apprehensive, saying that "Once the Americans get hold of it the whole series would be vulgarised and ruined." Eventually, an agreement was reached and Awdry received an advanced payment of £500. A pilot episode was commissioned from Granada, which would feature 2D cutouts of the engines moving along a background in a style reminiscent of Ivor the Engine, with involvement from animator Brian Cosgrove. The cutouts and backgrounds were based on illustrations from The Railway Series. The pilot episode was completed by early 1976, but Granada ultimately decided not to produce a full series, as they feared that at the time Awdry's stories were not popular enough outside the UK to justify the time and money needed to make the series. Andrew Lloyd Webber later established the Really Useful Group in 1977, a name derived from the phrase "Really Useful Engine". He would go on to work on a musical loosely inspired by The Railway Series, called Starlight Express, which premiered in 1984, and became one of his most well-known works.

Early years and the series' success
In 1979, British television producer Britt Allcroft was producing a documentary on the Bluebell Railway, a heritage railway in Sussex which featured in the Railway Series book Stepney the Bluebell Engine. As part of her research before filming, Allcroft read some books in The Railway Series and was highly entertained and impressed with the stories which Awdry had written, later remarking that "there was something in the stories that I felt I could develop that would connect with children. I saw a strong emotional content that would carry with little children's experiences with life."

Allcroft worked to convince Awdry that she could, with funding, convert the stories into a successful television show. Her efforts were successful, and she purchased the television rights from the publishers of The Railway Series at a cost of what was then £50,000 ($74,000 in U.S. dollars at the time). Allcroft still had to work to raise the money to finance production and (despite showing a keen interest) wanted a level of creative control which she did not want to forego. In the end, after several years of searching and having to place a second mortgage on her home, Allcroft raised sufficient funding from her local bank manager. 

By 1981, Allcroft had secured the finances to produce the show. She started to assemble the crew, including producer and director David Mitton, the founder of Clearwater Features Ltd.; crew member Steve Asquith; American-born producer Robert D. Cardona; and composers and songwriters Mike O'Donnell and Junior Campbell.

As a 5-minute TV segment (1984–2000)
The series started production in 1984, produced by Clearwater Features Ltd. (Mitton and Cardona's company) and ITV's Central Independent Television region. The series was originally shot and produced with live action models at the Clearwater in-house studio in Battersea, a suburb of London, for Series 1. Production was later relocated to Shepperton Studios, Surrey, southwest of London, for subsequent series. The use of moving models was seen at the time of the series' conception as an effective method of animating the stories. Locomotives and other vehicles were operated by radio controls, while humans and animals were static figures. Stop motion was occasionally employed for instances in which a human or animal character would move. Hand-drawn animation was used in Series 3 to create bees (as seen in the episode "Buzz Buzz").

The first series (1984) used stories from the first eight books, along with one specially written by the Rev. W. Awdry, Thomas's Christmas Party. The second series (1986) used stories from Book No.9 (Edward the Blue Engine) to Book No.30 (More About Thomas the Tank Engine). The latter book was unusual, as it was written specifically by Christopher Awdry to be adapted by the show. At that time, it was a contractual obligation that the series could only adapt stories that appeared in print. The series also used a story from a Thomas Annual, "Thomas and Trevor", and a specially written stand-alone story, Thomas and the Missing Christmas Tree. One episode ("The Missing Coach") was in the process of being filmed, but was cancelled mid-way through filming as Allcroft decided it was too confusing for young viewers. The production team went on to use "Better Late Than Never" instead. The story "Gordon Goes Foreign" from the Railway Series book The Eight Famous Engines was also planned to be adapted but was scrapped due to budgetary limitations.

In between production of the second and third series, the production team were focused on producing two other television series: Tugs, which ran for one series in 1989 for Television South (TVS); and the American television series Shining Time Station, which repackaged Thomas the Tank Engine & Friends for the American television market from 1989 to 1996.

Clearwater closed on 31 December 1990, just before production of Series three, with The Britt Allcroft Company becoming the sole producer. Series three had its first 16 episodes released on VHS in November 1991 before its broadcast debut in 1992 on CITV. It was made at a cost of £1.3 million (approximately $9.3.million in U.S. dollars at the time). The series was a combination of episodes derived from The Railway Series, stories in the Thomas the Tank Engine and Friends magazine (written by Andrew Brenner, who would later become the show's head writer starting in Series 16), and original stories by Allcroft and Mitton.

One of the primary reasons for diverging from the original books was that many of the stories not yet used featured large numbers of new characters, which would be expensive to produce. Another reason was that the producers wanted more stories about Thomas (the nominal main character). Awdry complained that the new stories would be unrealistic (see Henry the Green Engine for more details). Robert D. Cardona left as producer, while Britt Allcroft joined David Mitton as co-producer. Angus Wright took over as executive producer.

Series 4 was first released direct to video between 1994 and 1995, before its broadcast debut on Cartoon Network. The producers planned to introduce some new female characters, including motor car Caroline, Nancy, and The Refreshment Lady. Some commentators took this as a response to accusations of sexism levelled against the series two years earlier. In reality, these were not "new" characters, but rather creations of Awdry from the original Railway Series books. Series four was almost entirely based on The Railway Series. The narrow-gauge engines were introduced, and were the focus of a number of episodes. Only one original story ("Rusty to the Rescue", written by Allcroft and Mitton) was used, but this took certain elements of its plot and dialogue from Stepney the "Bluebell" Engine.

The fifth series (1998) (also first released directly to video before its TV airings on Cartoon Network) was a radical shift, as all episodes were written by Allcroft and Mitton with no further stories being adapted from the Railway Series. This series saw the introduction of new characters, such as Cranky, The Horrid Lorries and Old Slow Coach. It also focused on more dramatic and action-oriented plotlines, along with more severe accidents, than the earlier series. After series 5, Angus Wright stepped down as executive producer. It was the final series broadcast on Cartoon Network, as Nickelodeon UK would eventually acquire the broadcast rights to the show for it to air on their newly created Nick Jr. channel in 1999. CN continued to air older series until their broadcast rights fully expired in 2001.

Thomas and the Magic Railroad was released in July 2000 in the UK, US, and Canada. It featured new characters created by Allcroft, along with characters from the show that had introduced Thomas to the U.S., Shining Time Station. Despite high production values and the popularity of the show, the film was criticised by British reviewers who were unfamiliar with Shining Time Station. The movie was well received by young children on both sides of the Atlantic, but made only $19.7 million at the box office, against a cost of  The film was broadcast on BBC1 on 1 January 2004 and again on 29 December 2008.

Later years
The Britt Allcroft Company (which changed its name to Gullane Entertainment in 2000) was purchased by HiT Entertainment, a company specialising in children's entertainment, in September 2002.

The sixth and seventh series (2002-2003) were first released directly to VHS and DVD as forty-six episodes in the US and fifty-two in the UK, and continued to introduce action-packed storylines, as well as new characters. These series saw the introduction of a writing staff. The sixth series (2002) saw an attempt to create a spin-off based on the successful Bob the Builder series. Two episodes introduced a group of construction machine characters known as "The Pack". The spin-off did not materialise for some time. Eventually, in 2006, thirteen episodes were released straight to DVD in two collections: On Site with Thomas and Thomas' Trusty Friends. It was the first series broadcast on ITV since series 3.

The fact that older sets were used and that the episodes were shot on 35mm camera (as opposed to the digital camera used at the time of the episodes' release) suggest it was filmed some time before Series 8. In Series 7 (2003) the programme title was officially shortened to Thomas & Friends, this name having been used on merchandise and video covers for three years previously. Phil Fehrle replaced Allcroft and Mitton as producer, although Mitton remained as the director. Executive producer Angus Wright was replaced by Peter Urie and Allcroft as executive producers for Series 6.

In 2003, Allcroft stepped down as executive producer, making Urie the sole executive producer for Gullane Entertainment, and Jocelyn Stevenson the executive producer for HiT Entertainment.

The eighth series (2004) was first released directly to VHS and DVD as four episodes in the US and six in the UK, before airing on television on Nick Jr. in the UK and PBS in the US. It introduced a number of significant changes to the show. Many members of the original founding team involved in the original show since 1984 left production, including Britt Allcroft, director and writer David Mitton, and original composers Mike O'Donnell and Junior Campbell. The latter two had been embroiled in a protracted legal dispute with HiT before their departure. Asquith, who was part of the original production team since 1984, took over as director, while Simon Spencer replaced Phil Fehrle as producer.

A new theme song and new incidental music was composed by Ed Welch and Robert Hartshorne, respectively. The episode runtime was increased to seven minutes. The series was produced using digital video cameras, creating a somewhat different look for the show. Other changes included the additions of CGI educational sequences and transitions between stories. Executive producer Peter Urie also left, while Jocelyn Stevenson remained in her role as executive producer. Sam Barlow became the story executive, while Abi Grant and Paul Larson served as script editors. This series saw the adoption of a centralised cast, including Thomas, Edward, Henry, Gordon, James, Percy, Toby and Emily.

HiT Entertainment was itself acquired by Apax Partners, a private equity company, in March 2005.

A straight-to-video film, Calling All Engines!, was released in 2005, shortly before series 9. While featuring characters from Thomas and the Magic Railroad, it was not a direct sequel. It proved successful; this resulted in more direct-to-video specials being produced.

Series 9 (2005) and 10 (2006) saw the expansion of the supporting cast with new and old characters. From Series 9 onwards, the narrator would call out the episodes' names, and from Series 11 onwards the theme song was began with the sound of a train whistle. Series 10 aired with twenty-eight episodes rather than the twenty-six of previous years. The eleventh series (2007) was filmed in high definition format. Twenty episodes aired in the original broadcast, while six were first released direct to DVD as Engines and Escapades and later aired on TV. Jocelyn Stevenson stepped down as executive producer after Series 10, with Christopher Skala taking her place as executive producer for Series 11. Sharon Miller became the script editor from Series 9 to 11.

Series 12 (2008) saw the introduction of CGI effects (provided by HiT Entertainment's subsidiary Hot Animation), with the intent of producing the show entirely in CGI the following year. The traditional models and sets were still used, but with computer animated faces superimposed on the models to allow for changing facial expressions. Humans and animals were fully computer animated to allow for walking movement. Only twenty episodes were produced and broadcast (the U.S. broadcast featured six additional episodes from Engines and Escapades). Sharon Miller became the head writer, starting with Series 12.

HiT announced multiple changes to the show beginning in 2009. One new aspect was the introduction of live-action host segments to Thomas home video releases. The host took the form of a character who worked on The Fat Controller's (Sir Topham Hatt's) railway, who would instruct viewers in craft projects. For the final 2 DVDs released for Series 12 in 2009, the host was named Mr. Arkwright, played by Robert Slate. In 2010, beginning with the DVD "Splish Splash Splosh", the host, played by Ben Forster, was named Mr. Perkins. Upon Forster's death in 2017, he was replaced by Mark Moraghan, who played "Mr Evans" in the web series.

Other major changes included a move to production in CGI (done for budgetary reasons), rather than the use of physical models, and the addition of a voice cast to support the established narrator. The DVD feature Hero of the Rails was the first Thomas & Friends production to showcase these changes, and Series 13 was the first television series in the new format. The CGI animation for the series was provided by Nitrogen Studios of Vancouver.

In September 2010, Apax was preparing to sell off HiT Entertainment and its franchises, including Thomas – regarded as the single most valuable asset – in order to help clear HiT's debts, and in February 2012, sold the company, along with the Thomas properties, to "US toy giant", Mattel.

During production of Series 16 (2012), Sharon Miller stepped down as head writer, and Andrew Brenner (who had written some Thomas stories in the third series) assumed the role, after serving as script editor for "Blue Mountain Mystery". Additionally, Sam Barlow stepped down as story executive after the sixteenth series, and the production of the CGI animation was moved from Nitrogen Studios (of Vancouver) to Arc Productions (of Toronto). King of the Railway and Series 17, both released during 2013, served as the first special and series, respectively, developed by the new animation and production teams, respectively.

2014 saw Tale of the Brave and Series 18, the second special and series animated by Arc, respectively. 2015 saw The Adventure Begins, a special coinciding with the 70th anniversary of the franchise, and Sodor's Legend of the Lost Treasure; Series 19 began airing that same year. 2016 saw some changes; longtime composers Robert and Peter Hartshorne (father and son team) left the series and Chris Renshaw and Oliver Davis took over. 2016 also saw Thomas & Friends: The Great Race; Series 20 began airing the same year. Series 20 was the last series of the show to air on PBS Kids; when Series 21 began airing in 2017, the American broadcast of the show was moved to Nick Jr., ending a period of almost 28 years of Thomas & Friends on American public television. 2017 also saw the release of Journey Beyond Sodor. The show was pulled away from Nick Jr. at the end of 2019.

A twenty-second series of Thomas and Friends consisting of 26 episodes was announced. This series saw many changes, such as Edward, Henry and Toby being removed from the Steam Team to make room for two new female steam engines named Nia (Africa) and Rebecca (UK), and the narrator being replaced with Thomas talking to the audience (however, Mark Moraghan, the previous narrator said that he would still work on the series). Series 22 is set after Big World! Big Adventures!, which came out on 20 July 2018. It introduces gender-balanced and multicultural characters which was and still is a hot topic amongst fans, and features a new theme tune. The series is split into two halves; the first half sees Thomas travelling around the world and visiting India, Australia, and China, while the second half takes place back on the Island of Sodor. The series was released on Netflix, Amazon and Hulu in late 2018.

Thomas & Friends was renewed for a 23rd series which debuted in 2019.

The 24th series was released in September 2020. The series was also the final series animated by Jam Filled Toronto, as well as the last series of the entire original series.

A second live-action/animated Thomas & Friends film is in development at Mattel with Marc Forster serving as director.

Reboot

On 12 October 2020, it was announced by Mattel that the series would be rebooted with Thomas & Friends: All Engines Go and that Nelvana would co-produce and animate the series. The deal stipulated that 104 11-minute episodes and 2 60-minute specials would be produced, and that the animation would transition from 3D full CGI animation (used since its transition to full CGI in 2009) to 2D animation, with new refreshed redesigns for Thomas and his Friends. On 5 February 2021, it was announced that Cartoon Network and Netflix had jointly picked up the broadcast and streaming rights to the series in the United States, respectively.

Voice cast

Originally, narrating was used as the only voice in the series until 2008. Britt Allcroft thought it essential to convey the episode as a story that would be read from a book at home. Individual voice-over actors were given to both the UK and US dubs of the series, following the switch to full CGI animation in 2009. The narrators include Ringo Starr, Michael Angelis, George Carlin, Alec Baldwin, Michael Brandon, Pierce Brosnan, Mark Moraghan, John Hasler, and Joseph May.

Characters

List of productions

Television series

Films, specials, and miniseries

Home video history

Over the history of the programme, the TV episodes and specials have been released for home viewing in a variety of compilations, formats, and languages, by a variety of publishing houses.

Production

Storytelling
Up until series 12, narration and dialogue were performed by a single storyteller. Starting from series 22 up until series 24, Thomas the Tank Engine himself takes over as the narrator and breaks the fourth wall.

Models
The original live action models were filmed on giant 16 x 20 model railway layout sets that were built and dismantled one by one for each episode's scenes. The models were built to the 1:32 scale, known in model railway circles in "Gauge 1". From Series 1 to 3, the locomotives used chassis made by Märklin, along with scratch built plastic bodies. Along with the moving eyes, eyelid mechanisms and resin faces, these bodies included smoke generators. For the first five series, the rolling stocks were made using Tenmille kits and most of them were later replaced with duplicates made from resin casts. Later models were constructed entirely from scratch. Some of the models from the sister television series Tugs were reused in later episodes of the series.

From Series 5 to 12, some larger-scale models were used for the narrow gauge characters, to more easily fit the complex mechanisms into them while retaining a sufficient level of detail. In Series 6, the characters known as "the Pack" (construction machines) were also constructed on a large scale, and larger models of Thomas and Percy were made to interact with them. In the ninth series, another large-scale Thomas model was built to be at the same scale as the narrow gauge engines and to provide greater possibilities for interaction. It was joined by a large version of James in the tenth series. Among the CGI switch in 2009, some of these models were put on display in a special exhibit at Drayton Manor Theme Park's Thomas Land. Nitrogen Studios (who provided the animation for the series from series 12 to 16) also had some of the original models on display.

Animation techniques
The live action models used in 1984 could not lip sync. HIT's subsidiary HOT Animation introduced the use of CGI in the show about 20 years later, first to add smoke and other effects. In 2009, HIT introduced a fully CGI series. In Series 12, CGI by Nitrogen Studios was used to animate the characters' faces and to make the people and animals move. The 13th Series was the first to be fully animated in CGI.

Music
Mike O'Donnell and Junior Campbell composed the show's original main title theme, incidental music and 36 songs; these were used for series 1–7, comprising 182 episodes and music videos between 1984 and 2003. The instruments for series 1–2 were synthesised with the Roland Jupiter-6 and instruments for series 3–7 were synthesised with the E-mu Proteus sound module.

In 2004, Robert Hartshorne took O'Donnell and Campbell's place as composer, while Ed Welch became the show's songwriter from Series 8 to The Great Discovery. Welch left after The Great Discovery. Hartshorne took his place as songwriter from Series 12 and onwards. From Day of the Diesels/2011-2016, Robert's son Peter Hartshorne helped him with the music.

In 2016, the Hartshornes left the series, and Chris Renshaw and Oliver Davis took their places.

A new theme song was introduced in 2018.

Head writer

Since series 12, there has been a head writer for the series. Prior to the introduction of a head writer, the script editor performed similar duties. Sharon Miller served as head writer from series 12–16, when she was replaced by Andrew Brenner. Brenner had written many "Thomas" stories for various magazines, as well as his own original stories (several of which were later adapted for television episodes in Series 3 and Series 5, and for which he had remained uncredited). Brenner had been a writer of several other children's animated series, such as Angelina Ballerina, Tractor Tom, Fireman Sam, Spot, Poppy Cat, and Binka, as well as being the creator of Caribou Kitchen and Humf, and writer for several magazines featuring children's characters such as The Real Ghostbusters, Fireman Sam, and Thomas's sister series Tugs. He took over as head writer for Thomas for King of the Railway, serving in this capacity until leaving during the twenty-third series. David Stoten succeeded him as head writer for the twenty-fourth series. Sharon Miller has also been the voice director since the second CGI animated film Misty Island Rescue,and continues to work on the series in this capacity.

Script editors
 Abi Grant (series 6)
 Jan Page (series 7)
 Abi Grant and Paul Larson (series 8)
 Sharon Miller (series 9-11)
 Becky Evans (series 16, last few episodes)

Head writer
 Sharon Miller (series 12–16)
 Andrew Brenner (series 17–23)
 David Stoten (series 24)

Broadcast

In the United Kingdom, Thomas & Friends was originally broadcast on ITV until 2006. Since then it has been broadcast on Channel 5's Milkshake! strand.

In the United States, the series had first appeared in the form of sequences on Shining Time Station, during the program's 1989 to 1995 run on PBS. The sequences of the series later aired in 1996 on Mr. Conductor's Thomas Tales. The series aired as Storytime with Thomas on Fox Family (now Freeform) from 1999 to 2000. Thomas & Friends returned in the form of several direct-to-video releases during season 6 (2002 to 2003) and as a stand-alone half-hour program on PBS Kids. it was distributed from 2004 to 2007 by Connecticut Public Television, and then by WNET from 2008 to 2017. It also aired on Sprout from 2005 to 2015. The rights to broadcast the series through PBS expired in December 2017, thus ending a period of almost 30 years of programming related to Thomas & Friends on American public television. In 2018 and 2019, Nickelodeon held exclusive rights to the series in the United States. In 2020, the streaming rights were sold to Netflix, with traditional television rights (if any) left unresolved. It also airs on Kabillion.

The program airs in Australia on ABC Kids and CBeebies and on Four in New Zealand. In France, Southeast Asia, Spain and Italy, it plays on Disney Junior. In Canada, it formerly aired on TVOKids, Family Jr. and the Knowledge Network as a part of its Knowledge Kids block, and currently airs on Treehouse TV. In the Middle East, the show airs on MBC 3 and Spacetoon, and in the United Arab Emirates on e-Junior.

Other dubs

Apps 
Mattel partnered with several companies, including Budge Studios and Animoca Brands, to create apps based on Thomas & Friends. In 2010, Callaway Digital Arts created apps based on the brand. By mid-2011, thirteen Thomas apps were available. HiT Entertainment and Mattel both released apps under their own names. During the 75th anniversary press release in 2020, Mattel mentioned an intent for more apps.

Reception

Critical response
Common Sense Media rated the show a four out of five stars, writing, "Parents can be assured that this series has educational aspects as well as behavioural modelling. The Thomas the Tank Engine stories were conceived by a young British boy early in the 20th century, who would listen to the trains as they chuffed through the countryside. The stories he told his son – who has consequently passed them on to his own son – have been documented in books and toy train models. Since the series was introduced to television viewers in the 1980s, Thomas & Friends has seen a healthy fan base sprout worldwide."

Jessica Roake wrote in Slate that the series reflects "true 'white man's burden' style British imperialism", and in regards to Hatt, "One suspects that Sir Topham Hatt spent some time in colonial India." Roake acknowledged that the show since 2003 had more diverse characters. Jia Tolentino in The New Yorker acknowledged that as a girl she did not "take in anything that was actually happening", but after reviewing the show and internet posts about it as an adult, criticised what she saw as the "show's repressive, authoritarian soul."

University of Alberta professor Shauna Wilton wrote "A Very Useful Engine: The Politics of Thomas and Friends". Wilton (who justified her study by arguing that socialisation of children is an important aspect) wrote that she received "a combination of outrage, disbelief, and condescending dismissal" when she announced she was going to study the politicisation of the series, although some people gave her thanks. She stated that despite the inclusion of female characters by the 2000s, in the era after major social revolutions in real life the series was "largely unchanged" from when it was "created in a context of rigid social hierarchies, male dominance in the public sphere, and a strong social culture of good behavior, respecting authority, and following the rules."

Awards and accolades

Internet popularity
In the 2010s and then on, Thomas & Friends became the subject of several internet memes such as "Thomas' O-face", "It was time for Thomas to leave. He had seen everything", "Thomas the Dank Engine", and "The Fat Controller Laughed" and was even the centrepiece of an article for The New Yorker, which explored supposedly authoritarian subtexts present in the show.

Notes

References

Notes

External links

Official websites
 
 Awdry Family Site

Other sites
 

 
The Railway Series
1984 British television series debuts
2021 British television series endings
1980s British animated television series
1980s British children's television series
1980s preschool education television series
1990s British animated television series
1990s British children's television series
1990s preschool education television series
2000s British animated television series
2000s British children's television series
2000s preschool education television series
2010s British animated television series
2010s British children's television series
2010s preschool education television series
2020s British animated television series
2020s British children's television series
2020s preschool education television series
British children's animated adventure television series
British children's animated comedy television series
British children's animated fantasy television series
British computer-animated television series
English-language television shows
Channel 5 (British TV channel) original programming
George Carlin
ITV children's television shows
Direct-to-video television series
Nickelodeon original programming
Nick Jr. original programming
Film and television memes
Internet memes introduced in the 2010s
British preschool education television series
Television series about rail transport
British television shows based on children's books
Television series by Mattel Creations
Television series by WNET
Television series created by Britt Allcroft
Television series set on fictional islands
British television series revived after cancellation
Trains in fiction
Gullane Entertainment